Alfalfa's Aunt is a 1939 comedy short subject, the 176th entry in the Our Gang (Little Rascals) series originally created by Hal Roach. Produced by Jack Chertok for Metro-Goldwyn-Mayer and directed by George Sidney, the one-reel short was released to theaters in January 1939 by MGM. It is considered one of the best Our Gang shorts produced after Roach sold the series to MGM in mid-1938; the post-Roach era is generally considered a subpar era for Our Gang.

Plot
Alfalfa's Aunt Penelope sends the Switzers a telegram that says that she's coming to visit. She has given up her pursuits of being a sculptor and has turned to writing murder mysteries. Just before Alfalfa's parents leave to attend a meeting that night, Penelope reads Alfalfa's father John a page of her story, which is written in the form of a letter:

"Dear X,

I have discovered that only my nephew stands between me and the Switzer millions! So like the others, he shall die in agony - tonight - at the stroke of nine!"

After John and his wife Martha go out and leave Alfalfa in Penelope's care, Alfalfa stumbles upon the page that Penelope read to John. He becomes horrified, believing that his own aunt is plotting to murder him. He tells Penelope that he is going to bed and then summons the gang to help prevent him from being murdered. While dumping out poisons in the bathroom, Porky causes a sudden loud, long noise, which leads Penelope to believe that the house is being burglarized.

Eventually, Alfalfa's parents return home and the gang proudly tell the adults that they saved Alfalfa from being killed by his aunt. Angered by the insanity and misunderstandings, Penelope decides to pack up and leave immediately ("How can an author write in a madhouse like this?!"). The entire situation is explained and all the misunderstandings are cleared up. Before Alfalfa is given a chance to apologize to his Aunt Penelope, John rewards him with a dollar bill just for getting rid of her.

Cast

The Gang
 Carl Switzer as Alfalfa Switzer
 Eugene Gordon Lee as Porky
 George McFarland as Spanky
 Billie Thomas as Buckwheat
 Gary Jasgar as Slapsie
 Leonard Landy as Leonard

Additional cast
 Barbara Bedford as Martha Switzer, Alfalfa's mother
 Marie Blake as Martha's sister and Alfalfa's Aunt Penelope.
 William Newell as John Switzer, Alfalfa's father

See also
Our Gang filmography

References

External links
 
 
 

1939 films
1939 comedy films
American black-and-white films
Films directed by George Sidney
Metro-Goldwyn-Mayer short films
Our Gang films
1930s English-language films
1930s American films